Qatar Chah (also Romanized as Qaţār Chāh) is a village in Khangiran Rural District, in the Central District of Sarakhs County, Razavi Khorasan Province, Iran. At the 2006 census, its population was 134, in 26 families.

References 

Populated places in Sarakhs County